Sir John "Jack" Stewart-Clark, 3rd Baronet (born 17 September 1929) is a British businessman and former Member of the European Parliament (MEP). He represented the Conservative and Unionist Party in the European Parliament from 1979 until 1999.

Early life
John Stewart-Clark was born in Queensferry, Scotland. Stewart-Clark is the son of Sir Stewart Stewart-Clark, 2nd Baronet, and his wife Jane. Stewart-Clark was educated at Eton. He also attended Balliol College, Oxford, followed by the Harvard Business School, after his National Service, during which he had been commissioned into the Coldstream Guards in 1948, serving in North Africa. He was appointed in 1958 to the Royal Company of Archers, the Queen's Bodyguard in Scotland.

From 1953 to 1969, Stewart-Clark worked with the family firm of J. & P. Coats Ltd in Uruguay, Canada, Spain, Holland, Portugal and Pakistan. In 1969, he joined Philips, and he was Managing Director of Philips Electrical Ltd from 1970 to 1975, and of Pye Ltd. from 1975 to 1979. From 1979, he served as a non-executive director of several firms, including A.T. Kearney and TSB Scotland.

Political career 

Stewart-Clark stood in the General Election of 1959 as Unionist candidate for Aberdeen North, coming second to Hector Hughes. In the first direct elections to the European Parliament, in 1979, Stewart-Clark successfully stood in Sussex East, holding the seat until it was abolished in 1994. He continued as an MEP, sitting for the successor East Sussex and Kent South constituency until 1999. Within the European Parliament, Stewart-Clark represented the Conservative and Unionist Party, which was aligned with the European Democrat Group until 1992, after which Stewart-Clark sat with the Group of the European People's Party. Although sitting for an English constituency, he also acted as a representative of the Scottish Conservatives, who had no MEPs. He served as a Vice-President of the European Parliament from 1992 to 1997. He took part in several parliamentary delegations and chaired a number of initiatives, with a particular interest in the prevention of drug abuse, and subsequently became a trustee of the substance abuse group Mentor Foundation.

Stewart-Clark said in 2016 that he was in favour of continued UK membership of the European Union. Sir Jack said "We absolutely have to stay...It would be dreadful if we didn’t. It’s a plunge into the unknown." Following the 2016 United Kingdom European Union membership referendum of 2016, Stewart-Clark and the former Scottish Labour Member of Parliament Tam Dalyell proposed that Parliament should block the leave result.

Personal life 

In 1958, Stewart-Clark married Jonkvrouwe Lydia Loudon. Loudon is the niece of Jonkheer John Hugo Loudon; the great-niece of Jonkheer John Loudon, the Dutch Foreign Minister during World War One; and the great granddaughter of Jonkheer James Loudon, the Governor-General of the Dutch East Indies from 1872 to 1875. The couple have five children.

Post-political career 

In 1995, Sir Jack inherited Dundas Castle from his mother and began a programme of restoration. The castle, built in 1818 adjacent to a 15th-century tower house, had been bought by Stewart-Clark's great-grandfather, the Paisley thread manufacturer Stewart Clark, in 1899. Stewart-Clark and his wife, Lydia, now live in one wing, with the rest of the house rented out for weddings and other events.

Stewart-Clark is involved with the charity Passion Trust. In 2016, Stewart-Clark gained approval from the Vatican to take a Passion Play, dramatising the last days of Christ, to the Opera Jail in Milan, Italy. Stewart-Clark has said: "[Prisoners] can become redeemed in prison, even if you’re never getting out". It was reported that Archbishop Leo Cushley was supportive of this project.

References

External links
Dundas Castle

1929 births
Living people
People educated at Eton College
Conservative Party (UK) MEPs
MEPs for England 1979–1984
MEPs for England 1984–1989
MEPs for England 1989–1994
MEPs for England 1994–1999
Baronets in the Baronetage of the United Kingdom
Members of the Royal Company of Archers